Beacon High School is a private day school located in Watertown, Massachusetts, US. It provides a therapeutic, alternative, co-educational program designed for students with emotional or psychiatric problems, as well as mild to moderate learning disabilities. It has an enrollment cap of 65, ranging in age from 14 to 22. In 2017 the school also added a middle school classroom, which operates within the high school.

Beacon High School was founded in 1972 in Brookline, Massachusetts, as New Perspectives School. In September 2006, it moved to its current location in Watertown. In 1995, Beacon High School became affiliated with Walker, a program that serves children in grades K-8 with serious behavioral, emotional and psychiatric difficulties, as well as learning disabilities and some autism spectrum disorders. However, students do not typically progress from the Walker School directly to Beacon High School. The schools serve slightly different populations, and typically a Beacon High School student has had unsuccessful placements in public or other private schools prior to his or her enrollment at Beacon High School.

Students at Beacon are not placed in a specific grade level, and in some cases may take more than four years to graduate, due to unsuccessful previous placements or time spent in other treatment facilities. Students are given written evaluations each term in addition to letter grades. All students are assigned a staff therapist with whom they are required to meet weekly, as well as to attend a weekly session of group therapy.

Beacon High School is Chapter 766-approved by the Massachusetts Department of Education and certified by the Watertown School Committee to grant diplomas.

External links 
 

Private high schools in Massachusetts
Educational institutions established in 1971
Watertown, Massachusetts
Special schools in the United States
Private middle schools in Massachusetts
1971 establishments in Massachusetts